Glorious is a 2022 American comedy horror film directed by Rebekah McKendry, and starring Ryan Kwanten and J. K. Simmons. The film involves a heartbroken man who encounters a strange, all-knowing entity in a rest stop bathroom stall.

Plot
Wes, distraught over his breakup with his ex Brenda, stops his car at a roadside rest stop. That night, he gets blackout drunk and burns all his possessions, including his pants and box of photos. The next morning, he stumbles into an empty restroom to vomit. The man in the stall next to him starts up a conversation and reveals his name to be Ghatanothoa. As the conversation becomes uncomfortable, Wes realizes the door is sealed shut. Ghatanothoa explains that it is a demigod created by his primordial god father who accidentally created the universe, including humanity. Incredulous, Wes attempts to peek through the stall's glory hole and over the stall door to see it, despite Ghatanothoa's warnings not to, as glimpsing its true form would destroy Wes. Exerting its power, Ghatanothoa punishes Wes by giving him visions of Brenda. Wes attempts to escape through the air vent but finds himself back in the restroom.

Ghatanothoa explains that its father created Ghatanothoa as a tool to destroy humanity. However, Ghatanothoa's older siblings sealed their father away to stop him. But now, the god is free and Ghatanothoa, having developed affection for humanity, has hidden itself away from its father to avoid being used to destroy the universe. Ghatanothoa tells Wes that in order to permanently hide, it must transcend into the ethereal plane, but can only do so if its physical form is satisfied by a mortal, which must be done through the glory hole. While corporeal, Ghatanothoa's powers are weakened, further exposing its location to its father. Ghatanothoa is apologetic for what must be done and pleads with Wes to help it, arguing that humanity is precious. Wes counters with his own experiences of his abusive father and how he never felt anything for anyone, except for Brenda.

A maintenance worker arrives and Wes screams for help, despite Ghatanothoa warning him that this will end badly. The man also becomes trapped in the bathroom, and to prevent him from telling anyone about this, Ghatanothoa explodes him into blood and body parts. Wes uses his dismembered leg to try to bash down the door.

The stress eventually causes Wes to scream for Ghatanothoa's father to find them. The rest stop begins to crumble away as the god tears through reality. Desperate, Ghatanothoa removes Wes's memories of Brenda to show him what universal annihilation will mean. Wes relents and begs to see Brenda one more time in exchange for doing the deed. Ghatanothoa restores his memories, and Wes inserts his penis into the glory hole, only for Ghatanothoa to be shocked, clarifying that "satisfaction" means offering a piece of his liver, and passes him a shard of broken glass. With Ghatanothoa's father in sight, Wes cuts a hole in his abdomen, and allows Ghatanothoa to pull his liver out. In excruciating pain, Wes' thoughts reveal that he is a serial killer who murdered Brenda after discovering the photos of his victims in his box.

With Wes' offering, Ghatanothoa transcends into the ether, foiling its father. Wes weakly asks if this makes him a hero. Ghatanothoa departs, stating that he is no hero, and that as entities of destruction, both of them deserve to be forgotten and die. Wes soon dies just outside the restroom, holding a teddy bear Brenda had given him.

Cast
 Ryan Kwanten as Wes, a man distraught over the end of his relationship with his girlfriend
 J. K. Simmons as the voice of Ghatanothoa, a primordial demigod created by its godly father to destroy the universe
 Sylvia Grace Crim as Brenda, Wes's girlfriend
 Andre' Lamar as Gary C, a rest stop worker
 Tordy Clark as Sharon, a trucker
 Sarah Clark as Blonde Woman at Party
 Katie Bacque as The Bear

Production
In February 2022, it was announced that the film was "quietly nearing completion."

Release
In May 2022, it was announced that Shudder acquired distribution rights to the film in the United States, Canada, the United Kingdom, Ireland, Australia, and New Zealand. The film premiered at the 2022 Fantasia International Film Festival and was released on Shudder on August 18, 2022.

Reception
On the review aggregation website Rotten Tomatoes, the film holds an approval rating of 87% with an average rating of 7.1 out of 10, based on 54 reviews. The website's critical consensus reads, "With thought-provoking themes lurking beneath its absurd premise, Glorious is a brightly blood-spattered genre treat from director Rebekah McKendry."

Matt Donato of Slash Film rated the film a 7 out of 10. J. Hurtado of Screen Anarchy gave the film a positive review and wrote, "...McKendry’s Glorious is a fun, gooey, occasionally mean-spirited, but very creative cosmic horror that brings a new level of grossness to a location already thought of as super gross by most who are forced to use it."

References

External links
 

2022 films
2022 horror thriller films
American horror thriller films
2020s English-language films
2020s American films